Robert Le Vigan (born Robert Coquillaud, January 7, 1900 – October 12, 1972), was a French actor.

He appeared in more than 60 films between 1931 and 1943 almost exclusively in small or supporting roles. He was, according to film academic Ginette Vincendeau, a "brilliant, extravagant actor" who "specialised in louche, menacing or diabolical characters". 

A collaborator with the Nazis during the occupation, who openly expressed fascist attitudes, he vanished while playing Jéricho in Children of Paradise (Les Enfants du Paradis), a film deliberately released in May 1945 shortly after the liberation of Europe; Le Vigan was replaced by Pierre Renoir. He was sentenced to forced labour for 10 years in 1946. Released on parole after three years working in a camp, Le Vigan absconded to Spain, and then Argentina, dying there in poverty on October 12, 1972, in the city of Tandil.

Selected filmography

 Moon Over Morocco (1931) - Donald Strawber
 Radio Follies (1931)
 The Yellow Dog (1932) - Le docteur Ernest Michoux
 Une jeune fille et un million (1932) - L'employé brouillon de l'agence
 Coquin de sort (1932)
 Boubouroche (1933) - Potasse
 Knock, ou le triomphe de la médecine (1933) - Mousquet, le pharmacien
 The Little King (1933) - Le fou
 The Tunnel (1933) - Brooce - un Ouvrier Félon
 L'homme à la barbiche (1933) - Jérôme de Valvert / Le demi-frère de Jérôme de Valvert
 Madame Bovary (1934) - Lheureux
 La femme idéale (1934) - Girardin
 Street Without a Name (1934) - Vanoël
 Famille nombreuse (1934) - L'adjudant-chef Sandri
 Maria Chapdelaine (1934) - Tit-Sèbe, le rebouteux
 Bien mal acquis (1934)
 L'affaire Coquelet (1935) - Poireau, le jardinier
 Golgotha (1935) (known as Behold the Man in English) - Jésus Christ
 La bandera (1935) - Fernando Lucas
 Jérôme Perreau héros des barricades (1936) - Cardinal Mazarin
 Les mutinés de l'Elseneur (1936) - Charles Davis
 La ronde du brigadier Bellot (1936)
 Le prince des Six Jours (1936) - Fouilloux, un spectateur
 A Legionnaire (1936) - Leduc
 Jenny (1936) - L'Albinos
 Hélène (1936) - Le docteur Régnier
 The Lower Depths (1936) - L'acteur alcoolique
 Romarin (1937) - Le brigadier Napoléon Orsini
 The Man from Nowhere (1937) - Le comte Papiano
 Franco de port (1937) - Henri
 The Citadel of Silence (1937) - Granoff
 Harvest (Regain) (1937) - Le gendarme (uncredited)
 La femme du bout du monde (1937) - Arlanger, l'armateur
 The West (1938) - Taïeb el Haïn
 Boys' School (1938) - César le passe-muraille
 Storm Over Asia (1938) - Sir Richard
 Le Quai des brumes (1938) - Le peintre
 The Little Thing (1938) - Roger
 L'avion de minuit (1938) - Le Docteur
 Ernest the Rebel (1938) - Le gouverneur-président de Mariposa
 The Fatted Calf (1939) - Grussgolt
 Louise (1939) - Le peintre Gaston
 The World Will Shake (1939) - Le Greffier
 Le Dernier Tournant (1939) - Le cousin maître-chanteur
 The Phantom Carriage (1939) - Le père Martin
 Paradise Lost (1940) - Édouard Bordenave
 Romance of Paris (1941) - Monsieur Lormel
 Who Killed Santa Claus? (1941) - Léon Villard, le maître d'école
 Dédé la musique (1941) - Fernand l'Américain
 Chambre 13 (1942) - Fenouil
 Patrouille blanche (1942) - Le commissaire Pascal
 Vie privée (1942) - Rémi Géraud
 Andorra ou les hommes d'Airain (1942) - Asnurri
 Le mariage de Chiffon (1942) - Maître Blondin - l'huissier
 Les affaires sont les affaires (1942) - Phinck
 La grande marnière (1943) - Fleury
 The Heart of a Nation (1943) - L'oncle Michel Froment (uncredited)
 It Happened at the Inn (1943) - Goupi-Tonkin
 Ne le criez pas sur les toits (1943) - Le professeur Léonard Bontagues
 L'homme qui vendit son âme (1943) - Grégori
 La collection Ménard (1944) - Amédée Garbure
 Bifur 3 (1945) - Paul (uncredited)
 The King's Mail (1951) - Peabody
 The Orchid (1951) - The father
 Ley del mar (1952) - Rafael
 Rio turbio (1952) - Levignan (final film role)

References

External links

1900 births
1972 deaths
Male actors from Paris
French Popular Party politicians
Louis-Ferdinand Céline
French collaborators with Nazi Germany
French male film actors
French male stage actors
20th-century French male actors
20th-century French novelists